Whites is a BBC sitcom, written by Oliver Lansley and Matt King, directed by David Kerr, and starring Alan Davies as the executive chef at a country house hotel.  BBC Two gave the go ahead for the show to go into production in August 2009 with the first episode airing in September 2010. Whites aired for six episodes in 2010. On 1 March 2011 Davies announced that the BBC would not be renewing Whites for another series.

Plot
After the beginnings of a seemingly promising career, Roland White (Alan Davies) is executive chef at the White House hotel and well past his prime. He deals with his stuttered career by leaving much of the day to day difficulties of running the restaurant to his best friend and sous-chef Bib (Darren Boyd) and his restaurant manager Caroline (Katherine Parkinson). They try to cope with an incompetent waitress Kiki (Isy Suttie), ambitious apprentice chef Skoose (Stephen Wight) and the mercurial hotel owner Celia (Maggie Steed).

Production
Co-writer Matt King used his experiences working in restaurants to form the basis for Whites. "Whites is totally based on Hanbury Manor, where I worked. It’s a facsimile. Roland is a composite of several chefs I know who can’t be bothered any more. They’ve kind of missed the boat, missed out on Michelin stars and cruise along." King and Oliver Lansley tried to follow the lead of shows like Entourage and 30 Rock in writing Whites. In order to prepare for their roles, the cast trained under the chefs at Jamie Oliver's restaurant Fifteen. For her role as Kiki, Isy Suttie learned to play the trumpet.

Speaking on his Twitter feed on 1 March 2011, Alan Davies confirmed that Whites would not be returning for a second series. The BBC had elected to cancel the series as it cost £3 million ($4.8 million) for one series. Fans launched an unsuccessful "Bring Back Whites" campaign in response to the show's cancellation. Davies later complained to The Daily Telegraph that he "got an email from someone I’d never met" informing him of the decision to cancel the show.

Cast
 Alan Davies as Roland White, the Chef de cuisine
 Darren Boyd as Bib, Roland's long-suffering sous-chef
 Katherine Parkinson as Caroline, the restaurant manager and maitre d'
 Stephen Wight as Skoose, an unpleasant apprentice chef with ambitions for Bib's job
 Isy Suttie as Kiki, a scatty waitress
 Maggie Steed as Celia, the hotel owner
 Amit Shah as Axel, a cook

Episode list

Reception
Reviews of the series have been mixed to positive.  The Guardian wrote a generally positive review, stating the show is "gentle, subtly played, often funny and quite promising." Metro UK wrote the show didn't entertain as well as Gordon Ramsay, saying "The problem with doing a comedy about chefs and restaurants is that the real thing does it so much better."

Whites had 2.37 million viewers for its debut episode on 28 September 2010. The finale, which aired on 2 November 2010, attracted 1.58 million viewers. Since the ratings were above average, The British Comedy Guide speculated that "the show is a casualty of the BBC Comedy department having to make spending cuts".

Theme music
The opening and closing music is "Song for the Dead" by Alexander Wolfe.

U.S. adaptation
In October 2018, it was announced that Matt Tarses and Will Arnett were developing a new Whites series for NBC, based on the UK format, through Sony Pictures Television. Tarses will write the potential series and executive produce alongside Arnett, Marc Forman, Peter Principato, and the original series' creators Oliver Lansley and Matt King.

References

External links

Review

BBC television sitcoms
2010 British television series debuts
2010 British television series endings